.pg is the Internet country code top-level domain (ccTLD) for Papua New Guinea.

Registrations are made beneath the second-level names .com.pg, .net.pg, .ac.pg, .gov.pg, .mil.pg, and .org.pg.

The dispute resolution policy is similar to that of Network Solutions prior to the institution of the UDRP in 2000; a trademark owner can object to a domain registration and this will result in the domain being placed on hold unless the registrant can also demonstrate trademark rights (and post bond to indemnify the registry), or else get a court ruling in their favor.

On 10 May 2013, the ISO 3166-1 code for Papua New Guinea changed to reflect the PG used for the ccTLD.

References

External links
 IANA .pg whois information

Country code top-level domains
Telecommunications in Papua New Guinea

sv:Toppdomän#P